

Igor Rivin (born 1961 in Moscow, USSR) is a Russian-Canadian mathematician, 
working in various fields of pure and applied mathematics, computer science, 
and materials science. He was the Regius Professor of Mathematics at the University of St. Andrews from 2015 to 2017, and was   the chief research officer at Cryptos Fund until 2019. He is doing research for Edgestream LP, in addition to his academic work.

Career 
He received his B.Sc. (Hon) in mathematics from the University of Toronto in 1981, and his Ph.D. in 1986 from Princeton University under the direction of William Thurston.  Following his doctorate, Rivin directed development of QLISP and the Mathematica kernel, before returning to academia in 1992, where he held positions at the Institut des Hautes Études Scientifiques, the Institute for Advanced Study, the University of Melbourne, Warwick, and Caltech.  Since 1999, Rivin has been professor of mathematics at Temple University.  Between  2015 and 2017 he was Regius Professor of Mathematics at the University of St. Andrews.

Major accomplishments 
Rivin's PhD thesis and a series of extensions characterized hyperbolic 3-dimensional polyhedra in terms of their dihedral angles, resolving a long-standing open question of Jakob Steiner on the inscribable combinatorial types. These, and some related results in convex geometry, have been used in 3-manifold topology, theoretical physics, computational geometry, and the recently developed field of discrete differential geometry.

Rivin has also made advances in counting geodesics on surfaces, the study of generic elements of discrete subgroups of Lie groups, and in the theory of dynamical systems.

Rivin is also active in applied areas, having written large parts of the Mathematica 2.0 kernel, and he developed a database of hypothetical zeolites in collaboration with M. M. J. Treacy.

Rivin is a frequent contributor to MathOverflow.

Igor Rivin is the co-creator, with economist Carlo Scevola, of Cryptocurrencies Index 30 (CCi30), an index of the top 30 cryptocurrencies weighted by market capitalization. CCi30 is sometimes used by academic economists as a market index when comparing the cryptocurrency trading market as a whole with individual currencies.

Honors 
 First prize, Canadian Mathematical Olympiad, 1977
 Whitehead prize of the London Mathematical Society, 1998
 Advanced Research Fellowship of the EPSRC, 1998
 Lady Davis Fellowship at the Hebrew University, 2006
 Berlin Mathematical School professorship, 2011.
 Fellow of the American Mathematical Society, 2014.

References

External links 
 Igor Rivin's author profile at MathSciNet
 Igor Rivin's Google Scholar profile
 Igor Rivin at Math Overflow

 

Canadian mathematicians
Jewish American scientists
University of Toronto alumni
Geometers
20th-century American mathematicians
21st-century American mathematicians
Living people
1961 births
Fellows of the American Mathematical Society
21st-century American Jews